The 2004–05 season saw Partick Thistle compete in the Scottish First Division where they finished in 9th position with 39 points, suffering relegation to the Scottish Second Division.

Results
Partick Thistle's score comes first

Legend

Scottish First Division

Scottish Cup

Scottish League Cup

Scottish Challenge Cup

Squad statistics

League table

References

External links
 Partick Thistle 2004–05 at Soccerbase.com (select relevant season from dropdown list)

Partick Thistle F.C. seasons
Partick Thistle